Wes Brooker  (born 21 December 1946) is a retired Canadian sprinter. He competed in the men's 4 × 400 metres relay and the 400 metre hurdles at the 1968 Summer Olympics.

References

1946 births
Living people
Athletes (track and field) at the 1968 Summer Olympics
Canadian male sprinters
Canadian male hurdlers
Olympic track and field athletes of Canada
Athletes from Winnipeg